Joseph A. Errigo (November 30, 1938 – April 27, 2020) was an American politician who represented New York's 133rd Assembly District in the New York State Assembly from 2001 to 2010 and 2016 to 2018.

Early life and education
Errigo was born in Rochester, New York in 1938 and graduated from the Aquinas Institute in 1956. He served in the United States Marine Corps Reserve.

Career 
Errigo then worked as a draftsman for the New York State Department of Transportation. From 1965 to 1995, Errigo worked as a court reporter. He then established his own business, the Tiro Reporter Service, in 1978. He started a second business, Errigo Sand & Gravel, in 1995.

Errigo was elected as the representative for the 136th Assembly District in 2000. After redistricting, he represented the 130th Assembly District. He was a Republican. He did not seek re-election in 2010.

On September 14, 2016, Errigo was selected by a New York Republican State Committee to replace Bill Nojay on the general election ballot for the 133rd Assembly District. Nojay, the incumbent, had committed suicide several days before the primary election while under investigation for fraud. In the general election campaign, Errigo defeated Democratic candidate Barbara Baer.

In 2018, Errigo was defeated in a Republican primary, 61%-39%, by Marjorie Byrnes. Byrnes went on to defeat Democrat Barbara Baer in the general election.

On October 10, 2018, Errigo was charged with fraud and other crimes.

Death 
Errigo died on April 27, 2020, from complications of a fall suffered earlier in the year. He was 81. He had been in hospice care for dementia.

References

1938 births
2020 deaths
Politicians from Rochester, New York
Military personnel from Rochester, New York
Businesspeople from Rochester, New York
American draughtsmen
Republican Party members of the New York State Assembly
21st-century American politicians